Christian Life School is an independent, evangelical, interdenominational, co-educational, college-preparatory school located in Kenosha, Wisconsin in the United States.  It has 759 students, from Prekindergarten to 12th grade, and 54 teachers.

The school was founded in 1977 by Journey Church, and they currently have over 650 alumni. Carrie Wright is the principal of the Upper School, and Christie Gould is the principal of the Elementary School.  The Administrator is Dr. Jeff Bogaczyk.  The Upper School has a student/teacher ratio of 11 to 1, with an average class size of 15.

The school's mission statement makes clear the school's underlying outlook and aims:

References

External links
 http://www.kclsed.org/ (official homepage)

Private middle schools in Wisconsin
High schools in Kenosha, Wisconsin
Educational institutions established in 1977
Private high schools in Wisconsin
Private elementary schools in Wisconsin
Preparatory schools in Wisconsin
1977 establishments in Wisconsin